Gymnodoris ceylonica is a species of sea slug, a dorid nudibranch, a marine gastropod mollusk in the family Polyceridae.

Distribution
This species occurs in the tropical Indo-Pacific Ocean.

Description
Gymnodoris ceylonica has a translucent white body which is covered with many orange spots. It has translucent orange-lined white gills and orange rhinophores. The foot is translucent white and edged with an orange margin.

References

 MacNae, W. & M. Kalk (eds) (1958). A natural history of Inhaca Island, Mozambique. Witwatersrand Univ. Press, Johannesburg. I-iv, 163 pp.
 Gosliner T.M., Behrens D.W. & Valdés A. (2008) Indo-Pacific nudibranchs and sea slugs. Sea Challengers Natural History Books and California Academy of Sciences. 426 pp.

External links
 Gymnodoris ceylonica page at nudipixel

Polyceridae
Gastropods described in 1858